The Tomon Railway Company (Japanese: 図們鉄道株式会社, Tomon Tetsudo Kabushiki Kaisha; Korean: 도문철도주식회사, Domun Cheoldo Jusikhoesa), was a privately owned railway company in Japanese-occupied Korea.

History
The Tomon Railway's line ran from Kainei to Tōkanchin, and was opened in three stages: the Kainei–Jōsanpō section was completed on 5 January 1920, the Jōsanpō–Shōjō section on 1 December 1922, and the Shōjō–Tōkanchin section on 1 November 1924.

The narrow-gauge Tiantu Railway, opened in 1923, signed a cross-border operational agreement with the Tomon Railway on 26 June 1926, after which a bridge across the Tumen River between Jōsanpō and Kaishantun was opened on 30 September 1927.

The last line to be opened by the Tomon Railway was the  Kainei Colliery Line from Kainei to Keirin, which was opened on 11 August 1928.

This line was nationalised on 1 April 1929, becoming the West Domun Line of the Chōsen Government Railway (Sentetsu). Subsequently, merged with Sentetsu's East Tomon Line (Tōkanchin–Yūki), the management of the entire line was transferred to the South Manchuria Railway; at that time, the merged Tomon Line was added to the existing (Genzan-Seishin) Kankyō Line. In 1933 the Manchukuo National Railway bought the Tiantu Railway, converting it to standard gauge to make a shorter, more direct line from Kaishantun to Chaoyangchuan on the MNR's Jingtu Line to Xinjing, opening the new line for use at the end of March 1934.

After the end of the Pacific War, the Provisional People’s Committee for North Korea nationalised all railways in the Soviet zone of occupation on 10 August 1946, and following the establishment of North Korea, the Korean State Railway was created. After the end of the Korean War, the restructuring of the North Korean railway system, including the rearrangement of rail lines, led to the Hoeryeong–Sambong line becoming part of the Korean State Railway's Hambuk Line running from Cheongjin to Rajin via Namyang.

Rolling stock
Little is known about the Domun Railway's motive power; however, it is known that four 2-6-2T tank locomotives operated by the Domun Railway became Sentetsu's Pureko- and Purero-class locomotives after nationalisation of the company.

Network

References

Rail transport in North Korea
Rail transport in Korea
Korea under Japanese rule
Defunct railway companies of Japan
Defunct railway companies of Korea